Matthew Owen "Matt" Murray (born September 18, 1989) is an American actor.

Early life 
The youngest of eight siblings, Murray was born in Detroit, Michigan. After graduating from high school, he moved to Toronto, and then Los Angeles, to pursue an acting career.

Career
Murray began his career in 2012 with guest roles in television series such as The Firm and Suits. He subsequently played the recurring role of Officer Duncan Moore in the police drama series Rookie Blue (2014–2015). In 2015, Murray played Brian in the short-lived television series Kevin from Work. In 2016, Murray starred in the recurring role of Tony in the USA Network series Eyewitness. On March 1, 2017, the series was canceled after one season. In 2017, Murray played a supporting role in the CBS sitcom 9JKL; the series received negative reviews from critics. On May 12, 2018, the series was canceled after one season.

In 2017, Murray was featured prominently in the third season of the web series Teenagers. As part of an ensemble cast that includes Emmanuel Kabongo, Chloe Rose, and Raymond Ablack, he won the award for Best Ensemble at the 2018 HollyWeb Festival, and also received a nomination for Best Ensemble at the 9th annual Indie Series Awards. 

Murray plays Officer Gene Clemens on In the Dark, and he appeared in four episodes of Snowpiercer.

References

External links
 

21st-century American male actors
Living people
American male television actors
Male actors from Detroit
1989 births